Ché OVNI is a 1968 Argentine science-fiction musical comedy film directed by Aníbal Uset and starring Juan Carlos Altavista, Javier Portales, Jorge Sobral, and Marcela López Rey.

Background
Ché OVNI was only the second space film to be made in Argentina, after El Satelite Chiflado (The Crazy Satellite). The film is about alien invaders who abduct a tango-singer. OVNI means "UFO"; a newspaper article from the Cine Herald, July 17, 1968, depicted a cartoon Martian landing in the capital of Spain" a part of the promotion to the film.

Plot
An alien envoy arrives on Earth to kidnap a porteño tango singer and she is taken to planet where there is no live. She and other aliens of the planet wish to feel love again and the computers inform her that she is well-suited to trying to accomplish this, and results in a series of tango performances. The aliens fall in love with the tango singer Jorge (Jorge Sobral).

Principal cast
  Juan Carlos Altavista as Juan
 Javier Portales as Professor
 Jorge Sobral as Jorge
 Marcela López Rey as Cósmica
 Erika Wallner as Rubia
 Perla Caron as Amarilla
 Zelmar Gueño as Pierre

Reception
Shot on locations in London, Paris, Madrid and Buenos Aires, the film was considered "one of the most thunderous commercial failures" in Argentine film. 
However, Augusto R. Giustozzi said that Jorge Sobral "excelled" in his role.

References

External links
 

1968 films
Argentine science fiction comedy films
Argentine musical comedy films
1968 musical comedy films
1960s science fiction films
1960s Spanish-language films
Films about extraterrestrial life
Science fiction musical films
Alien abduction films